John McEnroe and Peter Rennert were the defending champions but they competed with different partners that year, McEnroe with Peter Fleming and Rennert with Chip Hooper.

Hooper and Rennert lost in the first round to Fleming and McEnroe.

Fleming and McEnroe lost in the semifinals to Brian Gottfried and Paul McNamee.

Brian Gottfried and Paul McNamee won the doubles title at the 1983 Queen's Club Championships tennis tournament defeating Kevin Curren and Steve Denton in the final 6–4, 6–3.

Seeds

Draw

Final

Top half

Bottom half

References

External links
Official website Queen's Club Championships 
ATP tournament profile

Doubles